PS Bangli is a defunct Indonesian football club based in Bangli, Bali. They used to play in the top division in Indonesian football, the Liga Indonesia. Their home stadium is Kapten i Wayan Dipta Stadium (now home to Bali FC). The club hit financial difficulties in 2005 and has decided to discontinue its run. This led to an opportunity for other clubs from Bali to merge and form a club using Perst Tabanan's license to compete in the Liga Indonesia. Local clubs such as Perseden Denpasar, Persekaba Badung and Persegi Gianyar merged with Persegi Gianyar to form a new club called Bali FC.

Football clubs in Indonesia
2005 disestablishments in Indonesia